Malesherbia laraosensis is a member of Malesherbia (Passifloraceae) described in 2014 by Hamilton Beltran and Maximilian Weigend. It is the only member of the genus known to inhabit Laraos, Peru. It is described as a small shrub, with branch lengths up to 15 cm long, these features make it morphologically distinct from other Peruvian members of the genus. It has orange flowers with red tips, and flowers from May - July.

References 

Plants described in 2014
Flora of Peru
laraosensis